The Cyprus men's national field hockey team represents Cyprus in men's international field hockey competitions and is controlled by the Cyprus Hockey Association, the governing body for field hockey in Cyprus.

The team competes in the EuroHockey Championship IV, the fourth level of the men's European field hockey championships.

Tournament record

EuroHockey Championship IV
2005 – 4th place
2011 – 4th place
2013 – 
2015 – 7th place
2017 – 4th place
2019 – 4th place
2021 – Cancelled

Hockey World League
2016–17 – Round 1

FIH Hockey Series
2018–19 – First round

References

European men's national field hockey teams
National team
Field hockey